Lords of the Deep is a 1989 American science-fiction horror film co-produced by Roger Corman, about an underwater colony being attacked by alien life forms. Actors included Bradford Dillman and Priscilla Barnes.

It was one of several underwater-themed films released around 1989; similar films distributed during that time included The Abyss, Leviathan, DeepStar Six, The Evil Below, and The Rift.

Plot

Set on board an undersea laboratory in a near-future ocean where the Earth's ozone layer has been depleted and new means of habitation and survival are being explored, biologist Claire is working on an unknown specimen when she experiences psychic visions. Meanwhile, a routine crew replacement is inbound in a minisubmarine when an undersea quake occurs. Contact is lost with the sub and a search sub is sent out to investigate the silence, while one of the lab's crew works on exterior repairs in a diving suit. The search sub discovers the relief sub is now derelict and the hatch blown with no sign of the crew and is promptly attacked by large, stingray-like creatures. After repelling one creature with an electrical discharge, the second sub is overpowered by more of the rays and contact is lost again.

The crewman working outside the lab is then attacked and the crew find him half out of the lab's moon pool. When his mask is removed, he is revealed to have been totally transformed into a gelatinous mass. Commander Dobler orders the mass quarantined, but Claire and Barbara the medical officer over-ride him and the mass is moved to the lab, where it is discovered to be both identical in composition to the substance Claire was studying, and also to be mutating into a man-sized stingray-like creature.

The creature escapes its tank and proceeds to move about the station while crew attempts to find it. Claire experiences more visions and is called, too. A crew member is discovered dead after finding himself unable to get out of a room, and the commander denies autopsy. Quakes continue periodically, and a sub sent out to salvage one of the lost subs is also taken by the creatures outside.

Claire and her lover O'Neil must work to uncover the mystery of her visions and the contradictions of the creatures behavior when crew members are vanishing or being killed.

Cast
Bradford Dillman as Stuart Dobler
Priscilla Barnes as Dr. Claire McDowell
Daryl Haney as Jack O'Neill
Melody Ryane as Dr. Barbara Stottelmyre
Eb Lottimer as Thomas Seaver
Greg Sobeck as Stanley Engel
Richard Young as Raymond Chadwick
Stephen Davies as Robert Fernandez 
Roger Corman as Corporate executive (uncredited)

Production

Future two-time Academy Award winner Janusz Kamiński served as the director of photography on the second unit crew for about two weeks of the four-week shooting schedule, in what was one of his first movies as a director of photography. According to a crew member who was present during production, Kamiński's footage was simply "too good" and did not match up well with the first-unit footage. Kamiński was taken off the crew before shooting was completed, but his footage was edited into the final film and can be spotted for its mysterious lighting and camera movements, though he is uncredited.

Another double Oscar winner (Aliens & Terminator 2) Robert Skotak, along with his brother Dennis Skotak, created the underwater visual effects for the film. When asked by the same crew member why he chose to work on such a low-budget film, Skotak said: "It's four weeks paid work, and on a Roger Corman movie, you get to work with people on their way up, and on their way down."

Legacy
The film is one of six movies featured in season 12 of Mystery Science Theater 3000.

Reception

In Creature Feature, the movie was given one out of five stars, finding it to be an uninspired quickie.

References

External links
 
 
 

1989 films
1989 horror films
1980s monster movies
1980s science fiction horror films
American monster movies
American science fiction horror films
Films with screenplays by Daryl Haney
1980s English-language films
1980s American films